FIFA Street 3 is an arcade-style sports game for the Xbox 360, PlayStation 3 and Nintendo DS. It is the third game in the FIFA Street series from EA Sports BIG, and is the last title released under the brand. This game was followed up by the 2012 reboot of FIFA Street, but that game does not have EA Sports BIG sub-brand (it uses the standard EA Sports branding instead).

Gameplay
The game's emphasis is on arcade-style fun and street football style tricks rather than real-life simulation. The game features more than 250 players from 18 different international teams. Players are identified by unique moves and show off their signature style of play. This enables gamers to experience "all the style and attitude" that is characteristic of street football. Enhancing this stylistic form of play are the exotic locations and interactive environments. Gamers are immersed in a "hyper-real world where players run up walls, environments pulsate to the music, and surroundings explode to life with each goal or trick."

Development
It was developed under the EA Sports BIG division of EA Sports, which is also responsible for such titles as SSX, NBA Street, NFL Street, and the FIFA Street games. Electronic Arts confirmed that a third FIFA Street game was being developed for next-generation consoles to be released in 2008. A demo for FIFA Street 3 was released on 17 January 2008 on the Xbox Live marketplace for the Xbox 360 and on the PlayStation Store for the PlayStation 3. The cover features Brazilian star Ronaldinho, English star Peter Crouch, and Italian star Gennaro Gattuso. According to producer Joe Nickolls, these iconic players were chosen for the cover because they represent "three of the different types of players available in our game and we were able to exaggerate their qualities to really create larger-than-life-characters." The different types of players in the game are categorized as Tricksters, Playmakers, Finishers, and Enforcers.

Reception

The game was met with mixed reception upon release.  GameRankings and Metacritic gave it a score of 65% and 63 out of 100 for the Xbox 360 version; 64% and 63 out of 100 for the PlayStation 3 version; and 57% and 56 out of 100 for the DS version.

References

External links

2008 video games
EA Sports games
EA Sports Big games
FIFA (video game series)
Association football video games
Street football video games
Nintendo DS games
PlayStation 3 games
Sports video games set in the United States
Video games developed in Canada
Xbox 360 games
Video games set in Brazil
Video games set in the Czech Republic
Video games set in Italy
Video games set in Mexico
Video games set in Romania
Video games set in the United Kingdom
Exient Entertainment games
Multiplayer and single-player video games